The following are the national records in athletics in Armenia maintained by the Armenian Athletic Federation (AAF).

Outdoor

Key to tables:

+ = en route to a longer distance

h = hand timing

A = affected by altitude

Men

Women

Indoor

Men

Women

Notes

References
General
World Athletics Statistic Handbook 2022: National Outdoor Records
World Athletics Statistic Handbook 2022: National Indoor Records
Specific

External links
AAF official website

Armenia
Records
Athletics
Athletics